Takhatgarh is a town in Pali District of Rajasthan state in India. The town is one of the nine municipalities in the district, located near the district border. It is only about 160 years old.

History

The town is named after Takhat Singh, the king of Jodhpur. It is said that migrants took permission of the king Takhat Singh and told him their desire that they want to establish a village on king's name and want to settle there. They dug a well, but the water was not sweet. They found one already dug well nearby and taken permission to settle there.

It is said that this well was dug by the 60,000 sons of King Sagara, who dug a well for their father every day. The well is still used as drinking water for the town, which is called Pechka.

After their settlement also the Thakur was coming there, and one soldier of king Pir Singh was killed there in struggle with Thakur. Pir Bavasi Majar is situated there now. In 1858 (Vikram Samvat 1914), Takhatgarh's Janma-Patrika prepared by Pandits and pond, cremation place, temples etc. established according to the Vastu. So now the town is about 150 years old. Chauhata is also called as Jawahar Chauk, as in 1947 on the occasion of independence here Guard of Honour was given to the country by police. The old police station was near Jawahar Chauk only.

Geography

It has an average elevation of 221 metres (725 feet) Area of Takhatgarh is 24 km2.

It is located near the Jalore district border. It lies on Jalore-Sanderao road NH325(old SH-16). Takhatgarh map can be seen on Google Maps. There is one pond and one dam also in Takhatgarh. Pond water is very useful here in increasing water level in wells, used for drinking water supply to the town.

Economy

Here people are mostly agriculture dependent and many people do business in other states like Maharashtra, Karnataka, Tamil Nadu, Gujarat etc. Except SBI, here three more banks are Bank of Baroda, MGB Gramin Bank and Pali Co-operative Bank.

In 1961–62, the highest per capita income was recorded at Rs. 17.86 per capita in Takhatgarh Panchayat. The Panchayat was richest in the Rajasthan that time.

Administration

Takhatgarh comes under Sumerpur tehsil of Pali district in Rajasthan state. It is represented in the center under Pali (Lok Sabha constituency), while in state it is represented under the Sumerpur (Rajasthan Assembly constituency). First Sarpanch of the village was Saremal Kesarimal Sanghavi. It is a municipality of class IV since 1974. Takhatgarh was considered as town in 1951, but in the 1961, as definition of the town is changed, so it is made again rural during 1961 to 1974. Shri Banshilal Baldiya was first municipality chairman.
He was visionary leader. He had planned many locations like new bus stand, Khedawas during his tenure. There are 25 wards for the municipality. Presently Takhatgarh has BJP board and Chairperson is Lalit Rankawat elected in 2021. Earlier recent chairmen in reverse chronological order are Ms. Ranjana Kumari, Raju Rawal, Ambadevi Rawal, Kanchan Jainam, Chandan Gandhi, Jayanti Jainam.

Takhatgarh municipality is the only municipality in Rajasthan, which also manages the water supply to the town.

Transport

The usual mode of transport is state-owned buses, although private buses are also a part of it, whereas for long journeys trains are preferred and the most preferred station is Falna, which is approx 28 km from the town. Some people prefer Jawai Bandh.
Few accidents involving state-owned buses at old bus stand causes loss of life. This demanded move of bus-stand to outer side and already identified land for bus stand utilized for this purpose. The Swami Vivekananda bus stand of Takhtgarh was made during the tenure of Mrs. Kanchan Jainam and it was inaugurated by honorable MP Pushp Jain.

Demographics

 India census, Takhatgarh had a population of 16,729. Males constitute 51% of the population and females 49%. Density per km2 is 678. Growth rate of population from 1991 to 2001 is 28.48% and 2001 to 2011 is 5.8% . Takhatgarh has an average literacy rate of 97%, lower than the national average of 99%: male literacy is 97%, and female literacy is 97%. In Takhatgarh, 14% of the population is under 6 years of age.

People and culture

There are mainly three religion Hindu, Jain and Muslim. They celebrate every festival with full joy. Deepawali, Holi and Eid are the main festivals here. The town is a center for the nearby all villages.

Here people speak mostly Marwari language, while official language is Hindi. There is one Govt Hospital, while many private clinics run by individual doctors. Here life is very peaceful. There is an old (Hindu) temple of Shri Kundeshwar Mahadev and Jain temple of Shri Adinath Bhagwan in the town. There is also temple of Jain deity Ambikadevi situated opposite to hospital. There are many temples of Hindu deities, some of them are Baba Ramdevji temple, Chondra Mataji temple, Mahalaxmi temple, Panchmukhi Hanuman temple, Gogaji Temple. On temple of Takhat Bihari Raj Thakurji's Pran Pratistha is happened on 29 April 2011. This temple is dedicated to the then king Takhat Singhji.

Education

There is one Govt high school, namely Sanghvi Keshari Senior Secondary School, having classes VIII to XII, three Govt. upper primary schools and three Govt Girls Schools out of them one is up to Senior Secondary level. While in Private there are many primary and middle schools out of which Defence Secondary School(An English Medium School), Abhay Nobles School, Tagore Public   Senior Secondary school located at Jalore road Takhatgarh, is one of the best schools of Takhatgarh, Sainik Children Academy, Saraswati Bal Vidya Mandir and Ray Gandhi Adarsh Vidya Mandir school are main. New Adarsh School is located at Adarsh Nagar in front of the bus stand. On the whole there are totally 22 schools in Takhatgarh. The present municipal administration is also trying to get sanction for a government college in Takhatgarh. One girls college Tagore Girls College, situated at Jalore road Takhatgarh affiliated with Jay Narayan Vyas university Jodhpur. In Takhatgarh one more college namely Shri Rajat College is also there and it is situated near new bus stand. Shri Rajat College, Takhatgarh is working in the field of computer education and distance education. In computer education it is approved from RKCL, Jaipur and providing RS-CIT course. In distance education it is approved centre from NIMS University, Jaipur, Jaipur National University, Jaipur and Jayoti Vidhyapeeth Women's University, Jaipur providing courses like BA, MA, BSC, MSC, BCOM, BCA, PGDCA, MCA, BBA, MBA, DMLT, BMLT, MMLT, etc.

Sub-areas

Some areas in Takhatgarh are:
 Jodha Nagar (Padarli Road)
 Sainik Colony (Ex Soldiers Coloney)
 Sav. Shri Sher Singh Ji Jodha Margh (Gogra road)
 Khedawas 
 Dhorawas 
 Mahaveer Basti 
 Chakki Gali
 Ramdev Gali 
 Sutharo ki gali 
 Hanumanji ki Gali 
 Main Bazar 
 Chunda Gali 
 Jogni Gali
 Nehru chauk (Chauhta)
 Kachramuta Gali
 Balana Gali
 Holi Chauk
 Masjid area
 Nehru Road
 Chauraha
 Vishwakarma Colony
 Chandanbala Nagar
 Taskavawas
 Adarsh Basti
 Bandhara Gali
 Talavo gali
 Bandi Gali
 Banshilal Baldia Marg
 Bheru Chauk
 Bhilo ki Basti
 Ulariya Marg
 Bokra Gali
 Gogra Road
 Kalalo Ki Gali
 Kharchiyawas
 Nag Chuak
 Sado Ki Gali
 Harijan Basti
 Ramkavawas
 Rabariyo ka was
 Rajpura Road
 Pechka Gali
 Suni Gali 
 Sanga Gali
 Sri Ram Colony

Photo gallery

References

External links
 Satellite view of Takhatgarh
 
 Population of Takhatgarh
 Official website of Govt. Senior Secondary School Takhatgarh

Cities and towns in Pali district